The A&R Terminal Railroad (ARTR) is a Class III American terminal railroad that serves Morris Transload of Morris, Illinois, United States. ARTR is owned by Quantix (formerly A&R Logistics), and began operations January 1, 2010. Its main commodity is transloadable products. ARTR interchanges traffic with Canadian National.

The total mileage of track the ARTR owns is approximately 6.25 miles (10.06km).

References

Switching and terminal railroads
Rail transportation in the United States
Illinois railroads